Arsenal Football Club Academy is the youth system of Arsenal Football Club based in Hale End, London, England. It is often referred to as Hale End eponymously by the club, sports media, and fans. The academy teams play in the Professional Development League, the highest level of youth football in England. The club also competes in the FA Youth Cup and UEFA Youth League competitions. Former player Per Mertesacker is the current academy manager.

Arsenal Under-21s, previously referred to as the Reserves, is the highest level squad within the setup. They train at the Arsenal Training Centre and play the majority of their home games at Meadow Park, which is the home of Boreham Wood FC. On occasion they also play at Arsenal's Emirates Stadium. Senior players occasionally play in the reserve side, as in the case when they are recovering from injury.

Arsenal's Academy is one of England's most successful, winning seven FA Youth Cups together with six Premier Academy League titles altogether. Numerous international players have graduated from the academy and reserve teams.

Under-21 team (previously reserve team) history

Early years (1887–1919)
Since Arsenal were based in Plumstead as Royal Arsenal F.C., they had a reserve side which was at first set up in 1887. The club initially played friendlies and cup competitions, winning the 1889–90 
Kent Junior Cup. In 1895–96, the club which was renamed Woolwich Arsenal in 1891, had their reserves join the Kent League, winning the title the next season but leaving circa 1900. They later joined the London League where they won three titles during the 1900s.

From 1900–01 to 1902–03, the reserves played in the West Kent League, winning the league title in every season they featured within such. As they were at a level higher than their local opponents, in 1903 the team moved to South Eastern League, playing there until 1914–15 when football was suspended due to the First World War. Concurrent to this period, the reserves also entered in the London League First Division in the 1906–07, 1907–08, 1908–09, 1913–14 and 1914–15 seasons. The club went on to omit the "Woolwich" from their title in 1913, so as to be known only as "Arsenal".

The Football Combination (1919–1939)
Following the end of World War I in 1918, Arsenal Reserves took the first team's place in the London Combination league which was renamed the Football Combination in the summer of 1939. For the 1926–27 season, the competition was expanded to include teams as far afield as Portsmouth, Swansea, Southend and Leicester. During the inter-war period Arsenal's reserves matched the first team's success, winning the League South A title of 1940 and 1943 as well as being the London league champions of 1942. Additionally, from 1931 onwards the club's reserves were entered into the London Challenge Cup, winning it twice in 1933–34 and as well in 1935–36.

To give opportunities to younger players, Arsenal created an 'A' team in 1929. Initially the 'A' team entered the London Professional Mid-Week League and were champions in 1931–32. They then competed in the league until the 1933–34 footballing season. Wherein, during the summer of 1934, Arsenal had taken on Kent side Margate as their nursery team. Arsenal had agreed to send promising youngsters to Margate to give them experience in the Southern Football League and were given first choice on any Margate players. The two clubs thus enjoyed being within this relationship which had lasted for four years before Arsenal broke it off in 1938. Afterwards, Arsenal entered the reserve team in the Southern League in its own right with home games being played at Enfield F.C.'s stadium at Southbury Road. The club eventually finished in 6th place in the league season of 1938–39.

At the start of the 1939–40 season the reserves played two Football Combination games and one Southern League game before football was partly suspended due to the outbreak of the Second World War.

The Football Combination (1945–1999)
For the 1946–47 season, the Football Combination resumed but the league was split into two divisions with the winners of each division playing in a final to decide the champions. A new competition was introduced – the Football Combination Cup. This was the same teams that played in the Football Combination but divided into 4 groups with the winners of each group playing in semi-finals and a final. This format continued until the end of the 1954–55 season. From 1955–56 the Football Combination continued generally as a normal league format, occasionally consisting of two divisions with promotion and relegation. The Football Combination Cup was discontinued but re-instated for seasons 1965–66 to 1969–70 inclusive and 1996–97. The reserves continued to be entered in the London FA Challenge Cup until the 1973–74 season, with the exception of 1961–62 when the first team were entered.

The 'A' team was resurrected at the start of the 1948–49 season when a team was entered in the Eastern Counties League, Eastern Counties League Cup and East Anglian Cup, winning the Eastern Counties League in 1954–55, after which they left the league (stating that it was so strong that they needed to enter a more competitive team, which would be more expensive), but continued to play in the East Anglian Cup for the next two seasons. In addition, the 'A' team was also entered in the London Professional Mid-Week League from 1949–50 to 1957–58, winning a second time in 1952–53. During the summer of 1958, the 'A' team was entered into the Metropolitan League, Metropolitan League Cup and Metropolitan League Professional Cup. This proved a very successful venture until the mid-1960s. Towards the end of the 1960s, the 'A' team struggled against strong amateur teams and the club declined to enter a team after the close of the 1968–69 season.

1999–present
In 1999 they left the Combination to become founding members of the Premier Reserve League. They never won the competition, although they did finish as runners-up in the 2001–02 and 2010–11 seasons. At the end of the 2011–12 season they finished 3rd in Reserve League South, in what would be the competition's final season. Players from the reserve team have also been used extensively in the League Cup since the 1997–98 season. At the beginning of the 2012–13 season Arsenal's reserve and academy structure received a major overhaul. The reserve team left the Premier Reserve League and joined the Professional Development League for the competition's inaugural season. Fundamentally, replacing the reserves with an Under-21 team that has the allowance of three over-age outfield players and one goalkeeper per match day.

At the beginning of the 2014–15 season Arsenal's academy coaching structure received a major change with Andries Jonker being appointed as head of academy on 1 July 2014, along with several key changes with in key coaching roles throughout the academy. In his time in charge of the academy, he instigated many changes, such as changes to the way the players were educated within the club, therefore helping them spend more time on site with their fellow players. He was also a key part in the new Hale End facility being built, with three pitches for the academy teams to make use of. In 2016 with the rebranding of the Premier League the reserve team continued to play in the Professional Development League, but it would now be named the Premier League 2. On 27 February 2017, it was announced the Andries Jonker would leave his role as head of academy to join VfL Wolfsburg as head coach, alongside former Arsenal player Freddie Ljungberg as assistant coach.

Academy (previously Youth) history

Arsenal Youth (1954–1998)
Arsenal have occasionally operated a youth team as far back as 1893–94, and there had been an established third team known as Arsenal 'A' for young players from 1929 to 1969.

The club have played in the FA Youth Cup since the 1954–55 season and then entered into the South East Counties Youth Football League simultaneously. The following season the league competition was renamed as the South East Counties League. Arsenal also featured from 1955 into another tournament known as the South East Counties League Cup wherein they stayed within while excluding the 1968 and 1969 seasons to the 1997–98 English footballing season. Arsenal's Academy altogether was victorious in the Counties League in 1956, 1965, 1972 and 1991. Arsenal's youths also played in the London Minor FA Challenge Cup from 1955 to 1956. In 1960 they rejoined the competition where they stayed until 1967 and was also successful in the Southern Junior Floodlit Cup which they won in 1956, 1972, 1975 and 1999.

Arsenal thus became, of youth teams in the country, the winners of seven South East Counties League titles and six South East Counties League Cups of which included three "doubles".

Arsenal Academy (1998–present)
The youth team became founder members of the FA Premier Youth League in 1997–98. The league was initially a single division and Arsenal won the inaugural title. The following season this was renamed the Premier Academy League and split into Under-19 and Under-17 sections, with the new FA Academy system formally changing Arsenal's youth team to Academy status. Arsenal entered teams in both sections, winning the U17 title in 1999–00 and the U19 title in 2001–02 as well as two more FA Youth Cups in 2000 and 2001.

Since 2004–05, the FA Premier Academy League has consisted of only a single section for Under-18s, although an Under-16 section is played with no league table being recorded. Arsenal U18s have won their division group (Group A) three times, in 2007–08, 2008–09 and 2009–10. They went on to win the academy play-off semi-final and final in 2008–09 and 2009–10 to become Premier Academy League champions. In 2009 they completed their first double by also winning the 2008–09 FA Youth Cup, having beaten Liverpool 6–2 on aggregate in the final.

Arsenal got to fourth place of the NextGen Series in 2013 and got to the quarterfinals of the newly created UEFA Youth League in 2014. In 2016, Arsenal's U21s won the semifinal of the Professional Development League's Division 2 playoffs 2–1 against Blackburn Rovers. In the final Arsenal beat Aston Villa by 3 goals to 1 at the Emirates Stadium so as to become playoff champions.

In April 2017, Arsenal's Under 13 team defeated Sunderland to lift the inaugural Premier League National Cup as champions. As well, in June 2017, Arsenal's Under-14s won the 2016-17 Premier League Albert Phelan Cup. On 7 July 2017, it was announced that Per Mertesacker, who retired from football at the end of the 2017–18 season, would take up the role of Arsenal Academy's manager thereafter.

Under-21s current squad

Out on loan

Under 18s current squad

These players can also play with the Under 23s and the senior squad.

Second-year scholars

First-year scholars

Schoolboys (U15/16s)

Current staff

Head Coaches:

Staff:

Honours
Reserves
Football & London Combination: 18
1922–23, 1926–27, 1927–28, 1928–29, 1929–30, 1930–31, 1933–34, 1934–35, 1936–37, 1937–38, 1938–39, 1946–47, 1950–51, 1962–63, 1968–69, 1969–70, 1983–84, 1989–90
Football Combination Cup: 3
1952–53, 1967–68, 1969–70
London FA Challenge Cup: 7
1933–34, 1935–36, 1953–54, 1954–55, 1957–58, 1962–63, 1969–70
Kent League: 1
1896–97
West Kent League: 3
1900–01, 1901–02, 1902–03
London League First Division: 3
1901–02, 1903–04, 1906–07
Kent Junior Cup: 1
1889–90
London Professional Mid-Week League: 2
1931–32, 1952–53
Eastern Counties League: 1
1954–55
Metropolitan League: 3
1958–59, 1960–61, 1962–63
Metropolitan League Cup: 2
1960–61, 1965–66
Metropolitan League Professional Cup: 2
1960–61, 1961–62

Academy
Professional Development League & Premier Academy League: 6 (record)
1997–98 (U18), 1999–00 (U17), 2001–02 (U19), 2008–09 (U18), 2009–10 (U18), 2015–16 (Play-Off Winners) (U21)
FA Youth Cup: 7 
1965–66, 1970–71, 1987–88, 1993–94, 1999–00, 2000–01, 2008–09
Premier League National Cup: 1
2016–17
South East Counties League: 4
1955–56, 1964–65, 1971–72, 1990–91
South East Counties League Cup: 6
1959–60, 1960–61, 1961–62, 1963–64, 1970–71, 1979–80
Southern Junior Floodlit Cup: 5
1962–63, 1965–66, 1984–85, 1990–91, 1997–98
London Minor FA Cup: 1
1966–67
NextGen Series: 2012–13 Fourth place

Academy graduates
This is a list of former Arsenal F.C. academy or Arsenal 'A' graduates who have gone on to represent their country at full international level since the Second World War. Players who are still at Arsenal, or play at another club on loan from Arsenal, are highlighted in bold.

  Ismaël Bennacer
  Anton Blackwood
  Emiliano Martínez
  Neil Kilkenny
  Matt Joseph
  Nico Yennaris
  Georgios Efrem
  Benik Afobe
  Peggy Lokando
  Nicklas Bendtner
  Tony Adams
  David Bentley
  Jay Bothroyd
  Danny Clapton
  Andy Cole
  Ashley Cole
  Leslie Compton
  Charlie George
  Kieran Gibbs
  Ray Kennedy
  Martin Keown
  Ainsley Maitland-Niles  Paul Merson
  Arthur Milton
  Ray Parlour
  John Radford
  Graham Rix
  David Rocastle
  Bukayo Saka  Len Shackleton
  Lionel Smith
  Emile Smith Rowe  Peter Storey
  Michael Thomas
  Jack Wilshere
  Karl Hein  Ingi Højsted
  Glen Kamara
  Serge Gnabry
  Emmanuel Frimpong
  Quincy Owusu-Abeyie
  Reice Charles-Cook
  Anthony Jeffrey
  Keanu Marsh-Brown
  Stefán Gíslason
  Valur Gíslason
  Narada Bernard
  Omari Hutchinson
  Alban Bunjaku
  Marcelo Flores  Carlos Vela
  Jernade Meade
  Donyell Malen
  Semi Ajayi
  Alex Iwobi
  Daniel Ballard
  Colin Hill
  Steve Morrow
  Terry Neill
  Sammy Nelson
  Pat Rice
  Dean Shiels
  Dejan Iliev
  Håvard Nordtveit
  Krystian Bielik
  Wojciech Szczęsny
  Graham Barrett
  Liam Brady
  John Devine
  Keith Fahey
  David O'Leary
  Frank O'Neill
  Niall Quinn
  Pat Scully
  Frank Stapleton
  Anthony Stokes
  Alfred Mugabo
  Paul Dickov
  Alex Forsyth
  Richard Hughes
  Armand Traoré
  Héctor Bellerín
  Cesc Fàbregas
  Kristopher Da Graca
  Sebastian Larsson
  Kristoffer Olsson
  Johan Djourou
  Gilles Sunu
  Gavin Hoyte
  Justin Hoyte
  Omar Rekik'''
  Colin Kazim-Richards
  Oğuzhan Özyakup
  Yunus Musah
  Frank Simek
  Ray Daniel
  Mal Griffiths
  Andy Marriott
  Hal Robson-Kanu
  Tom Walley
  Rhys Weston

References

External links
Official website
Information about the reserves from Arseweb
Arsenal FC Academy homepage on Arsenal.com (dated 2009)

Arsenal F.C.
Eastern Counties Football League
Football academies in England
1954 establishments in England
Metropolitan League
Premier League International Cup
UEFA Youth League teams
NextGen series
London League (football)